Sua rong hai is a Lao and Northeastern Thai local food cooked from brisket of beef, flavored with spices, grilled rare, sliced into small pieces, and served with sticky rice and other dishes. Its name is based on a local myth, which means "crying tiger".

Ancient belief 
Ancient Lao culture teaches that life depends on the forest, which is the food source for the people. There are many cows in the forest which are eaten by tigers. People would come across the remains of cows that were hunted down and eaten by the tigers. They personified the tigers as having emotions and feelings like humans. If this was true, they imagined the tigers would have cried because most of them left  the brisket cut to rot instead of eating it. People used this cut to cook a delicious dish and named it "crying tiger". On the other hand, it is the imagination of the ancient people that compare the appearance of the brisket cut to the skin of a tiger and called it "tiger meat". When the meat is grilled, the fat that accumulates in the muscle fibers is melted by the heat and drops like a tear. Using their imagination, they named the dish "crying tiger".

Preparation

Ingredients 
1. 500 grams of brisket cut beef thickness of 1 cm.

2. 1 tablespoon of fish sauce.

3. 1 tablespoon of white soy sauce.

4. ½ teaspoon of salt.

5. ½ teaspoon of ground pepper.

Procedure 
1. Mix the beef with the prepared seasoning and then refrigerate for 2 hours.

2. Grill the marinated beef on medium heat until rare.

3. Sliced the grilled beef into small pieces and serve on the dish.

Dipping 

The originally dipping sauce called namchim chaeo is also known as sour and spicy chili dip which is made from standard vegetables and spices. The ratio of ingredients and taste is up to the vendor's recipe which has special ingredients such as tamarind sauce instead of lemon juice and red onion and roasted chili.

Standard ingredients 
1. 2 tablespoon of powdered chili.

2. 1 tablespoon of coconut palm sugar.

3. 1 tablespoon of roasted rice.

4. 1 tablespoon of lemon juice.

5. 2 tablespoon of fish sauce.

References 

Beef dishes
Isan cuisine